Harry C. Stine (February 20, 1864 – June 6, 1924) was a pitcher in Major League Baseball. He played for the Philadelphia Athletics of the American Association during the 1890 season.

After baseball, Stine became a businessman. He died at his home in Niagara Falls, New York on June 6, 1924.

References

1864 births
1924 deaths
Baseball players from Pennsylvania
Major League Baseball pitchers
19th-century baseball players
Philadelphia Athletics (AA) players
Shenandoah Hungarian Rioters players